James Thomas Carroll (18 March 1843 – 1 April 1926) was an English professional cricketer. He played 33 first-class matches for Kent County Cricket Club between 1865 and 1869.

Carroll was born at Gravesend in Kent in 1843, the son of Jane Carroll. His mother, who worked as a charwoman, was widowed and he was raised in the town by her and an uncle.

After playing matches for Kent Colts sides in 1863 and 1864, Carroll was called into the county side in 1865, making his first-class debut against Sussex at Hove. He played in each of the four following season, regularly appearing for the county team. Described as a "free hitting batsman" who played with "good style" and a "wonderful field", Carroll played in a total of 33 first-class matches, all for Kent. He scored a total of 610 runs with a highest score of 48―made on debut―and took eight wickets.

Carroll worked as a plumber and decorator, but was also employed as a professional cricketer at Lancing College and at a variety of clubs, including Gravesend and Milton, his home side. He played for a variety of other club sides, scoring a century for the Mid-Kent club in 1871. He was married and had three children. Carroll died at Gravesend in 1926 aged 83.

References

External links
 

1843 births
1926 deaths
English cricketers
Kent cricketers
Sportspeople from Gravesend, Kent